Saidel Brito (born Saidel Brito y Lorenzo on December 4, 1973, in Matanzas, Cuba) is a prominent Cuban artist specializing in drawing, sculpture, installation and photography.

Brito studied in 1992 at the Escuela Nacional de Arte (ENA) and continued at Instituto Superior de Arte (ISA) in Havana, Cuba graduating in 1997.

Individual Exhibitions
 1992 – "Aruacos, Cubanos y Mitos ", Escuela Nacional de Arte (ENA), Havana, Cuba.
 1996 – "Cuentos bobos", Galería Espacio Abierto de la Revista Revolución y Cultura, Havana, Cuba.
 1998 – "Saidel Brito. Provisorische Utopien. Skulpturen und Zeichnungen", Ludwig Forum für Internationale Kunst, Aachen, Germany.
 2004 – "Saidel Brito: Habeas Corpus", dpm Arte Contemporáneo, Guayaquil, Ecuador

Collectives Exhibitions
He was part of many collectives exhibitions:
 1994 – "Shankar’s International Children’s Competition 1987", Nehru House, New Delhi, India.
 1995 – "No valen guayabas verdes", Bienal de La Habana, Instituto Superior de Arte (ISA), Havana, Cuba.
 1995 – "McEvilley and Me", Whitechapel Art Gallery, London, United Kingdom.
 1996 – "New Art from Cuba", Whitechapel Art Gallery, London, United Kingdom.
 1996 – "Salón de Arte Cubano Contemporáneo", Museo Nacional de Bellas Artes de La Habana, Cuba.
 1997 – Pabellón de Cristal, Madrid, Spain.
 1998 – "La cabra tira al monte", Miami Art Gallery, United States, Miami.
 1998 – VI Bienal Internacional de Cuenca, Bienal Internacional de Cuenca, Cuenca, Ecuador.
 1999 – "While Cuba Waits", Track 16 Gallery United States, Santa Monica, California.
 2002 – "Marco Alvarado & Saidel Brito", dpm Arte Contemporáneo, Guayaquil, Ecuador
 2005 – "Contiene Glutamato", Galería OMR, Mexico City, Mexico
 2006 – "WAITING LIST: Time and transition in Cuban Contemporary Art",City Art Museum of Ljubljana, Ljubljana,
 2007 – El Museo's Bienal: The (S) Files, El Museo del Barrio, New York City, New York

Awards
 1997– Raúl Martínez Prize –  Instituto Superior de Arte (ISA), Havana, Cuba.
 1998– Artist in Residence –  Ludwig Forum fur Internationale Kunst, Aachen, Germany.
 2003 – First Prize – "Salón de Julio", Museo Municipal de Guayaquil, Guayaquil, Ecuador.
 2005 – Third Prize – "Salón de Julio", Museo Municipal de Guayaquil, Guayaquil, Ecuador.

References
  Jose Veigas-Zamora, Cristina Vives Gutierrez, Adolfo V. Nodal, Valia Garzon, Dannys Montes de Oca; Memoria: Cuban Art of the 20th Century; (California/International Arts Foundation 2001); 
 Jose Viegas; Memoria: Artes Visuales Cubanas Del Siglo Xx; (California International Arts 2004);

External links
 Art Facts web page on the artist

Cuban contemporary artists
Living people
1973 births
Instituto Superior de Arte alumni